Mariusz Jurkiewicz (born 3 February 1982) is a former Polish handball player who last played for PGE Vive Kielce.

He participated at the 2016 Summer Olympics in Rio de Janeiro, in the men's handball tournament.

State awards
 2015  Silver Cross of Merit

References

External links
 Profile

1982 births
Living people
Sportspeople from Lublin
Polish male handball players
Handball players at the 2016 Summer Olympics
Olympic handball players of Poland
Expatriate handball players
Polish expatriate sportspeople in Spain
Liga ASOBAL players
BM Ciudad Real players
SDC San Antonio players
Wisła Płock (handball) players
Vive Kielce players
21st-century Polish people